The Battle of Majorca, also known as the Majorca Landings, was an amphibious landing of Republican forces early in the Spanish Civil War aimed at driving the Nationalists from Majorca and reclaiming the island for the Republic. After some initial tactical success, the expedition, commanded by Captain Alberto Bayo, ended in failure when the Nationalists counterattacked with ground troops and massively superior air power and drove the Republicans into the sea. So confident were the Republicans in their prediction of victory they optimistically called the operation "la reconquista de Mallorca" - "the reconquest of Majorca".

Background
Plans for a seaborne attack on the Balearic Islands seem to have surfaced independently in various Republican militia groups in the days following the joining of Ibiza, Formentera, and Majorca to Franco's Nationalist military rebellion. Already, on July 23, bomber squadrons struck Palma and Cabrera, and on August 1 a Republican expeditionary force from Menorca landed at Cabrera and resisted all efforts to dislodge it.

However these actions, and in particular the Majorca landings, were never approved by the Madrid government and had from the very beginning an air of confusion, and improvisation. On August 2, Bayo assembled a column of Barcelona militia on Menorca; the next day, the Republican air force dropped bombs on Palma once more. By August 2 logistical preparations overseen by the Barcelona government and the Council of Catalan Antifascist Militias (Comitè Central de Milicies Antifeixistes de Catalunya), were complete.

The Nationalist garrison of Formentera capitulated to Manuel Uribarri's Valencian militia on 7 August. On the 13th, 400 Catalan militia occupied Cabrera in an assault apparently unrelated to Bayo's expedition. Bayo tried to coordinate the two forces but the anarchist militias, distrustful of his Communist sympathies, refused to commit themselves to his operation.

The battle
On 16 August, with various units of the Spanish Republican Navy in support, Bayo landed his force of 8,000 militia at Punta Amer and Porto Cristo.

However, the Nationalists' fortunes improved dramatically on 27 August when supplies and air support arrived from nearby Italy. The Republican bomber forces ranging overhead were cut down and replaced by Italian aircraft. Consequently, the Republicans were unable to withstand the Nationalist counterattack on the ground and fell back in confusion, abandoning their guns and equipment. Their evacuation began on 5 September and the Republicans held the beaches until 12 September, when the last ship steamed off in retreat, leaving the island in Nationalist hands.

The Nationalist response was swift and, in contrast, remarkably successful. A week after the retreat from Majorca, Cabrera had once again fallen to the Nationalists. Ibiza was captured on 19 September by the Majorca garrison, and Formentera fell on the 20th.

See also 

 List of Spanish Republican military equipment of the Spanish Civil War
 List of Spanish Nationalist military equipment of the Spanish Civil War

References
 

1936 in Spain
History of Mallorca
Battles of the Spanish Civil War
Majorca
Naval aviation operations and battles
Naval battles of the Spanish Civil War
Conflicts in 1936
Battles involving Italy
Mediterranean naval operations of the Spanish Civil War
August 1936 events
September 1936 events
Amphibious operations involving Spain